Baricheh or Bereycheh or Bericheh may refer to:
 Baricheh, Ahvaz
 Baricheh, Karun
 Baricheh-ye Enayat
 Bereycheh, Shadegan